Kpando is one of the constituencies represented in the Parliament of Ghana. It elects one Member of Parliament (MP) by the first past the post system of election. The Kpando constituency is located in the Kpando District of the Volta Region of Ghana.

Boundaries 
The seat is located entirely within the Kpando District of the Volta Region of Ghana.

Members of Parliament

Elections

See also 

 List of Ghana Parliament constituencies
 List of political parties in Ghana

References 

Parliamentary constituencies in the Volta Region